Ramavandi-ye Sofla (also Romanized as Ramāvandī-ye Soflá; also known as Ramāvand-e Soflá) is a village in Suri Rural District, Suri District, Rumeshkhan County, Lorestan Province, Iran. At the 2006 census, its population was 582, in 99 families.

References 

Populated places in Rumeshkhan County